This is a list of wineries and vineyards in Virginia, United States.

Albemarle County
 Blenheim Vineyards
 Monticello Wine Company

Floyd County
 Chateau Morrisette Winery

Loudoun County
In 2013, there were 40 wineries in the county.

 Breaux Vineyards

Orange County
 Barboursville Vineyards
 Horton Vineyards

Roanoke County
 Valhalla Vineyards

Westmoreland County
 Ingleside Vineyards

References

External links
Loudoun Wine Trail
Visit Loudoun: DC's Wine Country

Wineries
Virginia